"Two Tribes" is an anti-war song by British band Frankie Goes to Hollywood, released in the UK by ZTT Records on 4 June 1984. The song was later included on the album Welcome to the Pleasuredome. Presenting a nihilistic, gleeful lyric expressing enthusiasm for nuclear war, it juxtaposes a relentless pounding bass line and guitar riff inspired by American funk and R&B pop with influences of Russian classical music, in an opulent arrangement produced by Trevor Horn.

The single was a phenomenal success in the UK, helped by a wide range of remixes and supported by an advertising campaign depicting the band as members of the Red Army. It entered the UK Singles Chart at number one on 10 June 1984, where it stayed for nine consecutive weeks, during which time the group's previous single "Relax" climbed back up the charts to number two. It was the longest-running number-one single in the UK of the 1980s. It has sold 1.58 million copies in the UK as of November 2012. Songwriters Johnson, Gill and O'Toole received the 1984 Ivor Novello award for Best Song Musically and Lyrically. In 2015 the song was voted by the British public as the nation's 14th-favourite 1980s number one in a poll for ITV.

Music
A version of "Two Tribes" was originally recorded for a BBC John Peel session in October 1982. The session version makes clear that the basic structure of the song, including its signature bass-line, percussion arrangement and idiosyncratic introductory and middle eight sections, were already intact prior to any involvement from ZTT or eventual producer Trevor Horn.

Johnson also noted: "There's  two elements in the music – an American funk line and a Russian line. It's the most obvious demonstration of two tribes that we have today." To accentuate the musical tension, Horn arranged the 'Russian' segments as a dramatic string arrangement. The driving funk/rock rhythm section was played on synthesisers.

Title and lyrics
The single was released at a time when the Cold War had intensified and fears about global nuclear warfare were at a peak. Although Johnson would attest in a 1984 radio interview that the "two tribes" of the song potentially represented any pair of warring adversaries (giving the examples of "cowboys and Indians or Captain Kirk and Klingons"), the line "On the air America/I modelled shirts by Van Heusen" is a clear reference to then US President Ronald Reagan. Reagan had advertised for Phillips Van Heusen in 1953 (briefly reviving the association in the early 1980s). The title of his first film had been Love Is on the Air.

The lyric "working for the black gas" is, according to Johnson, "About oil surpassing gold. How you might as well be paid in petrol." And the line "Are we living in a land where sex and horror are the new gods?" was inspired by the 1959 British film Cover Girl Killer. Johnson explained, "The TV was on in the background while I was doing me ironing and suddenly this character came out with that statement." (The actual dialogue, which occurs at about 48 minutes 24 seconds into the film, is "Surely sex and horror are the new gods in this polluted world of so-called entertainment?")

The track featured snippets of narration from actor Patrick Allen, recreating his narration from the British Protect and Survive public information films about how to survive a nuclear war. (The original Protect and Survive soundtracks were sampled for the 7-inch mixes.)

The 12-inch A- and B-sides featured voice parts by British actor Chris Barrie imitating Ronald Reagan. Barrie also voiced the Reagan puppet on Spitting Image. Barrie's parts as 'Reagan' included praise for the band, as well as parts of Adolf Hitler's speech to a court after the Beer Hall Putsch: "You may pronounce us guilty a thousand times over, but the Goddess of the Eternal Court of History will smile and tear to tatters the brief of the State Prosecutor and the sentence of this court, for She acquits us." Barrie also voiced the last sentence of "History Will Absolve Me" (Spanish: "La historia me absolverá") which is the concluding sentence and subsequent title of a four-hour speech made by Fidel Castro on 16 October 1953. Castro made the speech in his own defense in court against the charges brought against him after leading an attack on the Moncada Barracks on 26 July 1953. Barrie would return for the band's next single, "The Power of Love", imitating Mike Read in a parody of the DJ's ban on their previous single, "Relax".

The song's title derives from the line "two mighty warrior tribes went to war" from the film Mad Max 2 (the line is also spoken by Holly Johnson at the beginning of the session version).

Cash Box called it "a more scintillating anti-war track than ["The War Song"], saying it is "both an effective dance cut and a piece of modern art."

Promotion
ZTT aggressively marketed the single in terms of its topical political angle, promoting it with images of the group wearing American military garb in combat, as well as Soviet-style army uniforms set against an American urban backdrop.

The original cover art featured a Soviet mural of Vladimir Lenin in St Petersburg, and images of Reagan and then-UK Prime Minister Margaret Thatcher. The sleeve notes, attributed to ZTT's Paul Morley, dispassionately reported details of the relative nuclear arsenals of each superpower.

Original 1984 mixes
The song appeared in the form of six mixes, including "Annihilation", "Carnage", "Hibakusha", "Cowboys and Indians", "We Don't Want to Die" and "For the Victims of Ravishment".

The first 12-inch mix ("Annihilation") started with an air-raid siren, and included advice from Allen about how to tag and dispose of family members should they die in the fallout shelter (taken from the public information film Casualties). This version appeared on CD editions of the album. "Annihilation" was the basis for the "Hibakusha" mix, which was originally released in a limited edition, and appears on the Japanese-only 1985 album Bang!.

"For the Victims of Ravishment" appeared on the LP and cassette editions of the album Welcome to the Pleasuredome. It is the shortest version, at 3:27 minutes. This mix derived from the "Carnage" mix, which prominently featured strings as well as vocal samples from Allen and the group's B-side interview.

Since 1984, "Two Tribes" has been re-issued several times, generally involving third-party remixes bearing little relation to the original releases in terms of either structure or character.

B-sides
The 7-inch featured "One February Friday", an interview between Morley and the group's three musicians, Mark O'Toole, Brian Nash and Peter Gill, over an otherwise untitled instrumental track. A similar track had been included on the B-side of "Relax", with the title "One September Monday".

The principal B-side to the original 12-inch single was a cover version of "War", which became the subject of an extended remix (subtitled "Hidden") on the single's third UK 12-inch release, where it was promoted as a double A-side with "Carnage".

The UK cassette single featured a cut-together combination of "Surrender", "Carnage" and "Annihilation", plus Reagan snippets and interview sections not included on any other release.

Videos
The Godley & Creme-directed video depicted a wrestling match between then-US President Ronald Reagan and Konstantin Chernenko, then Secretary of the Communist Party of the Soviet Union, in front of group members and an assembly of representatives from the world's nations. The match eventually degenerates into global destruction. Certain violent moments ("Reagan" is seen, for example, biting "Chernenko's" ear) were edited from the version shown on MTV.

A longer version of the video (based on the "Hibakusha" mix) included an introductory, heavily edited monologue by Richard Nixon taken from an ad from his 1960 US Presidential campaign ("No ... firm diplomacy ... No ... peace for America and the world"), plus similar contributions from other world leaders, including Lord Beaverbrook, Yasser Arafat and John F. Kennedy. The complete soundtrack to the extended video was eventually released as "Two Tribes (Video Destructo)" on the German version of the Twelve Inches compilation. A third version of the video, included on the band's From An Wasteland to an Artificial Paradise VHS, retains the introduction, but omits most of the inserted clips in the main wrestling sequence.

Charts

Weekly charts

Year-end charts

Certifications

Track listing
All discographical information pertains to the original UK single release only.
 "Two Tribes" written by Gill/Johnson/O'Toole
 "War" written by Strong/Whitfield
 "One February Friday" credited to Gill/Johnson/Morley/Nash/O'Toole/Paul Rutherford

7": ZTT / ZTAS 3 United Kingdom
 "Two Tribes" – 3:57
 "One February Friday" – 4:55
The A-side mix is commonly referred as "Cowboys and Indians" to avoid confusion with other mixes, as ZTT commonly gives the sides on singles separate names. Thus, "One February Friday" is sometimes subtitled as either "Doctors and Nurses" (as per the regular 7") or "Only Bullets Can Stop Them Now" (as per the picture disc B-side label).

7" (picture disc): ZTT / P ZTAS 3 United Kingdom
 "Two Tribes" – 4:10
 "One February Friday" – 4:55
The A-side is an alternative mix to the regular 7" (subtitled "We Don't Want To Die" on the B-side label). A common theory within many fans is that "We Don't Want To Die" is essentially "Surrender" with vocals.

Also issued as a regular 7" in Canada.

12": ZTT / 12 ZTAS 3 United Kingdom
 "Two Tribes" (Annihilation) – 9:08
 "War" (Hide Yourself) – 4:12
 "One February Friday" (12" edit) - –1:46
 "Two Tribes" (Surrender) – 3:46
 ["The Last Voice"] (unlisted) – 1:14

12": Island Records / X-14065 Australia
 "Two Tribes" (Extended Version) – 9:10
 "War" (Hide Yourself) – 4:12
 "Two Tribes" – 4:11
 "One February Friday"  4:57
"Extended Version" is the same as "Annihilation".

"Two Tribes" on the B-side is the 7" picture disc mix.

12": ZTT / 12 XZTAS 3 United Kingdom
 "Two Tribes" (Carnage) – 7:54
 "War" (Hide Yourself) – 4:12
 "One February Friday" (12" edit) – 1:46
 "Two Tribes" (Surrender) – 3:46
 ["The Last Voice"] (unlisted) – 1:14

12": ZTT / WARTZ 3 United Kingdom
 "War" (Hidden) – 8:33
 "Two Tribes" (Carnage) 7:54
 "One February Friday" (12" edit) – 1:46

12": ZTT / X ZIP 1 United Kingdom
 "Two Tribes" (Hibakusha) – 6:38
 "War" (Hide Yourself) – 4:12
 "One February Friday" (12" edit) – 1:46
 "Two Tribes" (Surrender) – 3:46
 ["The Last Voice"] [Edited] (unlisted) – 0:35

12": ZTT / XZTAS 3DJ United Kingdom
 Two Tribes (Carnage) – 7:56
 Relax (New York Mix) – 7:23
"New York Mix" was mislabeled as "U.S mix".

MC: ZTT / CTIS 103 United Kingdom
 "[On The Subject of Frankie Goes to Hollywood]" – 0:23
 "One February Friday (part 1)" – 0:38
 "Two Tribes" (Keep The Peace) – 15:17
 "One February Friday (part 2)" – 1:08
 "War" (Somewhere Between Hiding And Hidden)  - 4:12
 "One February Friday (part 3) – 0:21
 "[War Is Peace]" – 0:05

"Keep The Peace" is a combination of Surrender, Carnage and Annihilation.

"The mixes on this Cassette single reissued on vinyl for Record Store Day 2022 as Side B of 'Altered Reels' - The Cassette single of "Relax" was reissued on Side A."

2014 Digital Download #1: Two Tribes
 "Two Tribes" (Annihilation 7") – 3:56
 "Two Tribes" (Carnage 7") – 4:12
 "Two Tribes" (Annihilation) – 9:09
 "Two Tribes" (Carnage) – 7:54
 "Two Tribes" (Hibakusha) – 6:37
 "Two Tribes" (Hibakush-ah!) – 6:59
 "One February Friday" – 4:57
 "The Last Voice" – 1:14
"Hibakush-ah!" is an early version of "Hibakusha".

2014 Digital Download #2: War (Hidden)
 "War!" (Hidden) - 8:33
 "War!" (Hide yourself!) – 4:14
 "One February Friday" (12" Edit) – 1:45
 "Two Tribes" (Surrender) – 3:44
 "War!" (..And Hide)  – 6:13
 "War!" (Coming out of Hiding) – 3:17

References

1984 singles
Frankie Goes to Hollywood songs
Jon Stevens songs
UK Singles Chart number-one singles
European Hot 100 Singles number-one singles
Number-one singles in Germany
Number-one singles in New Zealand
Dutch Top 40 number-one singles
Anti-war songs
Songs about nuclear war and weapons
Songs about Ronald Reagan
Music videos directed by Godley and Creme
Song recordings produced by Trevor Horn
Songs written by Holly Johnson
ZTT Records singles
1984 songs
1997 singles
Cultural depictions of Ronald Reagan
Cultural depictions of Richard Nixon